The year 2009 is the second year in the history of Ultimate Challenge MMA, a mixed martial arts promotion based in the United Kingdom. In 2009 Ultimate Challenge MMA held 8 events beginning with, UCMMA 2: Unbreakable.

Events list

UCMMA 2: Unbreakable

UCMMA 2: Unbreakable was an event held on February 7, 2009 at The Troxy in London, England, United Kingdom.

Results

UCMMA 3: Unstoppable

UCMMA 3: Unstoppable was an event held on March 28, 2009 at The Troxy in London, England, United Kingdom.

Results

UCMMA 4: Relentless

UCMMA 4: Relentless was an event held on May 9, 2009 at The Troxy in London, England, United Kingdom.

Results

UCMMA 5: Heat

UCMMA 5: Heat was an event held on July 11, 2009 at The Troxy in London, England, United Kingdom.

Results

UCMMA 6: Payback

UCMMA 6: Payback was an event held on August 22, 2009 at The Troxy in London, England, United Kingdom.

Results

UCMMA 7: Mayhem

UCMMA 7: Mayhem was an event held on September 19, 2009 at The Troxy in London, England, United Kingdom.

Results

UCMMA 8: Dynamite

UCMMA 8: Dynamite was an event held on October 24, 2009 at The Troxy in London, England, United Kingdom.

Results

UCMMA 9: Fighting for Heroes

UCMMA 9: Fighting for Heroes was an event held on December 5, 2009 at The Troxy in London, England, United Kingdom.

Results

See also 
 Ultimate Challenge MMA

References

Ultimate Challenge MMA events
2009 in mixed martial arts